The Battle of Friedlingen was fought in 1702 between France and the Holy Roman Empire.  The Imperial forces were led by Louis William, Margrave of Baden-Baden, while the French were led by Claude Louis Hector de Villars. The French were victorious.

Prelude 
The French were seeking to expand their influence on the eastern bank of the river Rhine. In the autumn of 1702, Villars received orders from Louis XIV to attack Swabia.
The French forces needed to join their Bavarian allies and defeat the Imperial troops that stood between them.

Battle 
The French crossed the Rhine at Weil am Rhein, just north of Basle on 14 October 1702. Villars attacked the Imperial army at Friedlingen.  The future field marshal Louis William entrenched his army and managed to hold the French for some time. He then retreated in good order to the North.

Aftermath 
It was a Pyrrhic victory for Villars. French losses differ between different sources, but were certainly high: Between 1,600 and 2,700 dead and wounded, whereas the Imperial forces lost between 3,000 and 4,000 men. Villars was also prevented from joining the Bavarians.

The villages on the eastern bank of the Rhine suffered much damage, especially Weil am Rhein.

Notes

References

External links
Villars writes about the battle of Friedlingen

Friedlingen
Friedlingen
Friedlingen
Friedlingen
1702 in France
Friedlingen